Matthew Ebden was the defending champion but chose not to defend his title.

Jordan Thompson won the title after defeating Nicola Kuhn 6–1, 5–7, 6–4 in the final.

Seeds

Draw

Finals

Top half

Bottom half

References
Main Draw
Qualifying Draw

Canberra Tennis International - Men's Singles
2018 in Australian tennis
2018